İhsan Burak Özsaraç (born 7 June 1979) is a Turkish retired professional footballer who played as a defender. He has also been capped by the Turkey A-2 squad.

Club career
Özsaraç, who was born in Karabük, began his professional career with local club Karabükspor in 1996. During his tenure with the club, he was loaned out to Çaycumaspor and Ankara Demirspor. He has also played for Kilimli Belediyespor, Konyaspor, MKE Ankaragücü, and Denizlispor.

References

1979 births
Living people
Turkish footballers
Turkey B international footballers
Turkey youth international footballers
Kardemir Karabükspor footballers
Ankara Demirspor footballers
Konyaspor footballers
MKE Ankaragücü footballers
Denizlispor footballers
Manisaspor footballers
Gençlerbirliği S.K. footballers
Association football defenders